Jeff or Jeffrey Evans may refer to:

Jeffrey Evans, musician
Jeffrey Evans, 4th Baron Mountevans, current Lord Mayor of London
Jeff Evans (umpire) (born 1954), Welsh cricket umpire
Jeff Evans, writer

See also
Geoff Evans (disambiguation)